Microsporum is a genus of fungi that causes tinea capitis, tinea corporis, ringworm, and other dermatophytoses (fungal infections of the skin). Microsporum forms both macroconidia (large asexual reproductive structures) and microconidia (smaller asexual reproductive structures) on short conidiophores. Macroconidia are hyaline, multiseptate, variable in form, fusiform, spindle-shaped to obovate, 7–20 by 30–160 um in size, with thin  or thick echinulate to verrucose cell walls. Their shape, size and cell wall features are important characteristics for species identification. Microconidia are hyaline, single-celled, pyriform to clavate, smooth-walled, 2.5–3.5 by 4–7 um in size and are not diagnostic for any one species.

The separation of this genus from Trichophyton is essentially based on the roughness of the macroconidial cell wall, although in practice this may sometimes be difficult to observe. Seventeen species of Microsporum have been described; however, only the more common species are included in these descriptions.

The keratinolytic properties that Microsporum cookei possesses suggests that the fungus can alternatively be used for recycling the large amount of industrial keratinic waste.

Species
Microsporum amazonicum
Microsporum audouinii
Microsporum boullardii
Microsporum canis
Microsporum canis var. distortum
Microsporum cookei
Microsporum distortum
Microsporum duboisii
Microsporum equinum
Microsporum ferrugineum
Microsporum fulvum
Microsporum gallinae
Microsporum gypseum
Microsporum langeronii
Microsporum nanum
Microsporum persicolor
Microsporum praecox
Microsporum ripariae
Microsporum rivalieri

References

External links
Doctor Fungus
Mycology Unit at the Adelaide Women's and Children's Hospital 

Parasitic fungi
Arthrodermataceae
Eurotiomycetes genera
Taxa described in 1843